Gaggio Montano is a comune (municipality) in the Metropolitan City of Bologna in the Italian region Emilia-Romagna, located about  southwest of Bologna.

Gaggio Montano borders the following municipalities: Castel d'Aiano, Castel di Casio, Grizzana Morandi, Lizzano in Belvedere, Montese, Alto Reno Terme, Vergato.

Economy
Piquadro, a leather goods company, is headquartered in the municipality.

Saeco, a household durables manufacturer, a subsidiary of Philips is headquartered in the municipality.

Twin towns
 Sauveterre, France

References

External links
 Official website

Cities and towns in Emilia-Romagna